Harold Teen is a 1928 American comedy film directed by Mervyn LeRoy and written by Thomas J. Geraghty. It is based on the comic strip Harold Teen by Carl Ed. The film stars Arthur Lake, Mary Brian, Lucien Littlefield, Jack Duffy, Alice White and Jack Egan. The film was released on April 29, 1928, by First National Pictures.

Cast       
Arthur Lake as Harold Teen
Mary Brian as Lillums Lovewell
Lucien Littlefield as Dad Jenks
Jack Duffy as Grandpop Teen
Alice White as Giggles Dewberry
Jack Egan as Horace Teen
Hedda Hopper as Mrs. Hazzit
Ben Hall as Goofy
William Bakewell as Percival
Lincoln Stedman as Beezie
Fred Kelsey as Mr. Lovewell
Jane Keckley as Mrs. Teen
Ed Brady as Officer Axel Dewberry
Virginia Sale as Mrs. Schmittenberger

References

External links
 

1928 films
1920s English-language films
Silent American comedy films
1928 comedy films
First National Pictures films
Films directed by Mervyn LeRoy
American silent feature films
American black-and-white films
1920s American films